The Primera División de Fútbol Profesional Clausura 2002 season (officially "Torneo  Clausura  2002") started on January 20, 2002.

The season was composed of the following clubs:

 C.D. FAS
 C.D. Municipal Limeño
 San Salvador F.C.
 C.D. Águila
 C.D. Luis Ángel Firpo
 Atlético Marte
 C.D. Atlético Balboa
 Alianza F.C.
 A.D. Isidro Metapán
 C.D. Dragón

Team information

Personnel and sponsoring

Managerial changes

Before the season

During the season

Standings

Semifinals 1st Leg

Semifinals 2nd Leg

Final

List of foreign players in the league
This is a list of foreign players in Clausura 2002. The following players:
have played at least one apetura game for the respective club.
have not been capped for the El Salvador national football team on any level, independently from the birthplace

C.D. Águila
  Mariano Villegas
  Emiliano Pedrozo
  Alexander Prediguer
  Mauro Núñez
  Rodinei Martins

Alianza F.C.
  Jair Muñoz
  Diego Pizarro 
  Jorge Sandoval
  Martin Garcia

Atletico Balboa
  Franklin Webster
  Ernesto Aquino
   Camilo Bonilla
   Jair Camero

Atletico Marte
  Andres Puig
  Pablo Leguizamo
  Raúl Toro
  Ricardo Bellacalzone
  Vladimir Suite

Dragon
  Andrés Molina
  Luis Marines
  Luis Iseles
  Juan Carlos Mosquera

 (player released mid season)
  (player Injured mid season)
 Injury replacement player

C.D. FAS
  Ariel Giles
  Alejandro Bentos
  Williams Reyes
  Victor Mafla
  Carlos Rendón

C.D. Luis Ángel Firpo
  Diego Rafael Álvarez
  Mauricio Dos Santos
  Victor Herrera Piggott
  Wáshington Hernández

A.D. Isidro Metapán
   Juan Fullana 
  Diego Oyarbide
  Luis Carlos Asprilla
  Anderson Batista
  Alessandro Rodríguez
  Jorge Wagner

Municipal Limeno
  Luis Alfredo Ramírez
  Gustavo Adolfo Gallegos
  Gustavo Mhamed
  Fausto Klinger
  Luis Martínez
   Víctor Avelenda

San Salvador F.C.
  Rodrigo Lagos
   Paulo César Rodríguez
  Alexander Obregón
  Orlando Garces
  Jaime Farfan 
  German Rodríguez 
  Carlos Rodríguez

External links

Primera División de Fútbol Profesional Clausura seasons
El
1